Lefau Harry Schuster (also known as Faualo Harry Schuster) is a Samoan politician and Cabinet Minister. He is a member of the FAST Party and was a founding member of the Tautua Samoa Party. He is the cousin of fellow FAST MP Toeolesulusulu Cedric Schuster.

Early life
Schuster was educated at St Joseph’s College in Samoa and St Paul's College, Auckland before studying law at Victoria University of Wellington. He worked for the New Zealand Ministry of Education before returning to Samoa to work in the Attorney General’s office. After time in private practice, he was appointed as a District Court Judge in 2000 before resigning in 2010 to enter politics. He has also served as president of the Federation of Oceania Rugby Unions. 

In September 2018 he was awarded the Faualo title by his village.

Political career
Schuster was elected to the Legislative Assembly of Samoa at the 2011 Samoan general election, as a candidate for Tautua. He lost his seat at the 2016 election.

In July 2020 Schuster criticised new electoral laws limiting candidate eligibility as unfair and discriminatory. In October 2020 Schuster announced he would stand as a candidate for the F.A.S.T. Party in the 2021 election. He was elected in the Vaimauga no. 4 constituency. On 24 May 2021 he was appointed Minister of Police and Prisons in the elected cabinet of Fiamē Naomi Mataʻafa. The appointment was disputed by the caretaker government. On 23 July 2021 the Court of Appeal ruled that the swearing-in ceremony was constitutional and binding, and that FAST had been the government since 24 May.

In his role as Minister in charge of the Electoral Commission Schuster advocated for electoral reform, including the repeal of "arbitrary" restrictions on candidacy and on MPs changing parties. As Police Minister he was critical of the impact of the Land and Titles Bill, claiming that it had led to village councils abusing their authority to violate human rights.

Notes

References

|-

|-

Living people
Members of the Legislative Assembly of Samoa
Samoan chiefs
Tautua Samoa Party politicians
Faʻatuatua i le Atua Samoa ua Tasi politicians
Government ministers of Samoa
Samoan judges
Victoria University of Wellington alumni
Year of birth missing (living people)
People educated at St Paul's College, Auckland